Hradištko may refer to places in the Czech Republic:

Hradištko (Nymburk District), a municipality and village in the Central Bohemian Region
Hradištko (Prague-West District), a municipality and village in the Central Bohemian Region